Urban rail transit in India plays an important role in intracity transportation in the major cities which are highly populated. It consists of rapid transit, suburban rail, monorail and tram systems. According to a report published in 2021, a total of 2.63 billion people travelled annually in metro systems across India's fifteen major cities, placing the country as one of the busiest urban rapid transit hubs in the world in terms of ridership.

The Ministry of Urban Development's Urban Transport wing is the nodal division for coordination, appraisal and approval of Urban Transport matters including Metro Rail Projects at the central level. All the interventions in the urban transport by the Ministry of Urban Development are carried out as per the provisions of National Urban Transport Policy, 2006.

Terminology
Indian cities have various types of urban transit systems operational, under construction and planned. These systems are being implemented based on the population of a city, financial feasibility and demand.

‡ Note: Metro Lite or Light Rail can be built with complete right of way if preferred so.

Rapid transit : The rapid transit or popularly known as metro in India, is an urban high-capacity rail system, commonly operated in metropolitan cities. These systems are segregated from Indian Railways and have their right-of-way.
Suburban Railway : Suburban rail or popularly known as local train system in India, is an urban rail transit system where the suburbs are connected to the city's centre. These systems are linked to and operated by Indian Railways. Example: Mumbai Suburban Railway
Medium-capacity rail : It is a rapid transit (metro) system which has a capacity higher than light rail but lower than rapid transit system to serve a medium demand. It is built considering the future rise in demand, so that it can be converted into a regular metro. Example: Rapid Metro Gurgaon
Light rail : Light rail which is also known as Metro Lite is used in cities that have low demand. It is a combination of rapid transit and tram systems. It has a higher capacity and speed compared to tram services and has dedicated tracks that are mostly fenced. Example: Srinagar Metro
Monorail : This system has trains running on a single rail/beam. It has found its application in medium capacity transport, but due to low efficiency and high costs, it has been sidelined in India. Example: Mumbai Monorail
Regional transit system : This system is operated either between two similarly sized cities, which are close to each other or between an urban city and smaller cities lying nearby. Example: Delhi–Meerut RRTS
Tram : These systems are one of the oldest modes of urban transport in India. They are low capacity, slow-moving trains which run on tracks that are embedded in the urban streets. Example: Kolkata Tram

Non-rail based urban transit
Bus Rapid Transit : The Bus Rapid Transit systems in India use conventional buses or high capacity buses and have their own right-of-way, separated from the rest of the traffic. Example: Ahmedabad Bus Rapid Transit System
Metro Neo : These are the Bus Rapid Transit systems that use overhead wires with power supply, similar to a trolleybus but with a higher capacity. They also have either a complete or partial right-of-way. Example: Greater Nashik Metro
Water Metro : A water-based urban transit system usually implemented in cities which are situated on river banks. These systems are basically integrated ferry systems. Example: Kochi Water Metro

History

Early history

The first-ever mode of the urban rail transit system in India was commuter rail (or suburban rail), built in Mumbai on 16 April 1853. The first passenger train was flagged off from Bori Bunder (present-day Chhatrapati Shivaji Terminus in Mumbai) from where it travelled to Thane, covering a distance of 34 km in an hour and fifteen minutes. This made it the Asia's first suburban railway. At the turn of the 20th century, tram systems began to sprawl across the four major cities of India, viz. Delhi, Kolkata, Chennai and Mumbai, and helped local population to meet their intracity transportation needs. Horse-drawn tram was first introduced in Kolkata in 1873 and the electric trams began to operate in Chennai in 1895, later the cities of Mumbai, Kanpur, and Delhi saw trams being introduced. These services were discontinued in all Indian cities between 1933 and 1964, except for Kolkata where they operate on streets to the present day as heritage.

Metro

In September 1919, during a session of the Imperial Legislative Council at Shimla, a committee was set up by W. E. Crum that recommended a metro line for Kolkata. The next proposal for a metro system was mooted by government of West Bengal in 1949-50 and a survey was conducted by French experts. However, the proposal could not be brought into the effect and India had to wait for its first metro service. It was twenty three years later when the foundation stone was laid in Kolkata in 1972 to commence the construction of the ambitious metro system. On 24 October 1984, India saw its first metro system operational in Kolkata. After several struggles and bureaucratic hurdles, a stretch of 3.4 km was opened with five stations on the line.

The first concept of an urban rapid transit system in Delhi came out during 1969, when a traffic and travel characteristics study was conducted. The bus systems which catered the public transportation in the city soon began to run out of capacity and the traffic was on the rise, this soon became a growing concern. The concepts for an urban transit system were considered as the need for the country's capital. After planning, a proposal was made in 1984, which revealed plans for constructing three underground corridors and augmentation of the existing suburban rail system. The construction began on 1 October 1998 and the first line was operational on 24 December 2002. With , the Delhi Metro went on to be the longest and by far the busiest metro system in India, which also served as a role model to other Indian cities.

Monorails and their replacement
While the political capital of India was expanding on its success by constructing new metro lines, suburban railways remained as the dominant mode of transport in the financial capital, Mumbai. According to Mumbai Metropolitan Region Development Authority (MMRDA) the city bus services operating in narrow and crowded areas of the city were slow-moving and caused traffic congestion hence a rapid transit system was necessary. Since the city already had planned metro services and since the suburban railways also connected major parts of the city, a feeder system to these services was proposed in the form of Monorail. After the construction was completed, On 1 February 2014, Mumbai Monorail became the first of its kind in India.

In the early 2010s, many cities had conceived the plan to build monorails as the major urban transportation solution to their cities. However, Mumbai's monorail soon began to reveal the underlying problems of a monorail system. The issues such as low ridership, inefficient track maintenance (accessibility of the tracks during maintenance as well as the time taken to repair the tracks), train slowing down at the switches and for the fact that the monorail tracks had to be entirely elevated with a dedicated depot and set of rolling stocks, raised the concerns on feasibility, cost of construction and operation of the new lines significantly. Hence, almost all of the monorail systems around the world are seen in amusement parks or similar theme parks instead as a solution to the urban public transportation. A traditional light rail system soon emerged as the efficient mode but with cheaper cost and greater capacity than what monorail offered. As a result, many Indian cities replaced their monorail projects with either a regular metro or a light rail system.

Rapid transit 

There are currently 16 operational rapid transit (popularly known as 'metro') systems in fifteen cities across India, with Delhi Metro being the largest. As of December 2022, India has 822.038 km of operational metro lines and 16 systems. A further 568.15 km of lines are under construction.

Apart from the Kolkata Metro (which has its own zone under Indian Railways), these rapid transit metro lines are not operated by Indian Railways, but a separate set of local authorities. In addition to their metro systems, the cities of Chennai and Hyderabad have mass transit systems operated by the Indian Railways, known as the Chennai MRTS and the Hyderabad MMTS, respectively. The first rapid transit system in India is the Kolkata Metro, which started operations in 1984. The Delhi Metro has the largest network in the entire country.

Implementation
In 2006, the National Urban Transport Policy had proposed the construction of a metro rail system in every city with a population of at least 20 lakh (2 million) people.

From 2002 to 2014, the Indian metro infrastructure expanded by 248 km.

Later on 11 August 2014, Union Government had announced that it would provide financial assistance for the implementation of a metro rail system to all Indian cities having a population of more than 1 million. In May 2015, the Union Government approved the Union Urban Development Ministry's proposal to implement metro rail systems in 50 cities, with the majority of the planned projects were to be implemented through special purpose vehicles, which will be established as 50:50 joint ventures between the Union and respective State Government. The Union Government would invest an estimated .

In a new draft policy unveiled in March 2017, the Central Government stated that it wanted state governments to consider metro rail as the "last option" and implement it only after considering all other possible mass rapid transit systems. The decision was taken due to the high cost of constructing metro rail systems. In August 2017, the Union Government announced that it would not provide financial assistance to the new metro rail project unless some sort of private partnership is involved.

List of systems

 OP + U/C = Operational & Under-construction combined
 OP + U/C+ Planned = Operational, Under-construction & Planned Combined

Systems in Development

Abandoned Systems

List of lines

Total no. of lines operational- 34.

Note : Only operational lines are listed.

Suburban rail 

Suburban rail plays a major role in the public transport system of many major Indian cities. These services are operated by Indian Railways. Suburban rail is a rail service between a central business district and the suburbs, a conurbation or other locations that draw large numbers of people daily. The trains are called suburban trains. These trains are also referred to as "local trains" or "locals". The suburban rail systems in Hyderabad, Pune, Lucknow–Kanpur and Bengaluru do not have dedicated suburban tracks but share tracks with long-distance trains. The suburban rail system of Mumbai, Kolkata and Chennai have both dedicated tracks and tracks shared with long-distance trains.

The first suburban rail system in India is Mumbai Suburban Railway which started operations in 1853. The Kolkata Suburban Railway has the largest network in the entire country. The Chennai Suburban Railway started its operations in 1931.

Suburban trains that handle commuter traffic are all electric multiple units (EMUs). They usually have nine or twelve coaches, sometimes even fifteen to handle rush hour traffic. One unit of an EMU train consists of one power car and two general coaches. Thus a nine coach EMU is made up of three units having one power car at each end and one at the middle. The rakes in the suburban rails run on 25 kV AC. Ridership on India's suburban railways has risen from 1.2 million in 1970–71 to 4.4 million in 2012–13. The suburban railways of Mumbai, Kolkata and Chennai occupy no more than 7.1% of the Indian Railways 20819.3-km network, but account for 53.2% of all railway passengers. In some cities of India, the opening of rapid transit systems has led to a decline in the use of the suburban rail system.

Systems in Development

Regional rail
Regional Rapid Transit systems in India are passenger rail services that operate beyond the limits of urban areas, and either connect similarly sized cities, or metropolitan cities and surrounding towns/cities, outside at the outer rim of a suburban belt. The following list excludes passenger train services provided by Indian Railways.

Systems in Development

Monorail

The Mumbai Monorail, which opened on 2 February 2014, is the first operational monorail system used for rapid transit in independent India. Many other Indian cities had planned monorail projects, as a feeder system to the metro, but after the Mumbai monorail failed with multiple issues, other cities are reconsidering the plan and may go ahead with much efficient and proven modes of transport such as the Light rail transit system.

Systems in Development

Abandoned Systems

Light rail 

Light rail transit (LRT) or popularly known as Metrolite in India, is a form of urban rail transit characterized by a combination of rapid transit and tram systems. It usually operates at a higher capacity than trams, and often on an exclusive right-of-way similar to rapid transit. Several tier-2 cities in India have opted it since it is a cheap and efficient mode of urban transit which serves for a lower demand. This list excludes Trolleybus or 'Metro Neo' systems which do not use rails.

Tram 

In addition to trains, trams were introduced in many cities in the late 19th century, though almost all of these were phased out. The Kolkata Tram is currently the only tram system in the country.

Systems in development

Abandoned Systems

National common mobility card 

The National Common Mobility Card (NCMC) is a card issued by government of India which enables citizens to pay multiple kinds of transport charges like Metro, bus etc., across the country.

To ensure a seamless travel across urban rail and various other transportation systems the Ministry of Housing & Urban Affairs (MoHUA) came out with the National Common Mobility Card (NCMC) Program.

The Union Ministry of Urban Affairs have been working on it since 2006, when it was envisaged as part of the National Urban Transport Policy (NUTP). This will help in higher digital payments penetration, savings on closed loop card lifecycle management cost and reduced operating cost.

Manufacturing
There are multiple metro manufacturers in India, Under the Union Government's Make in India program, about 75% of the rolling stock procured for use on Indian metro systems are required to be manufactured in India.

Bharat Earth Movers Limited (BEML) 
BEML is a Bengaluru-based Public Sector Undertaking company that manufactures mining equipment, heavy engineering as well as metro rail coaches. It also manufacturers EMU train sets for suburban railway.

Delhi Metro 

 Contract RS1 (Type RS1 Broad Gauge) - 70×4=280 coaches for Red, Yellow and Blue Line, in partnership with Mitsubishi and Hyundai Rotem.
 Contract RS3 (Type RS3 Standard Gauge) - 46×4+2×6=196 coaches for Green and Violet Line, in partnership with Mitsubishi and Hyundai Rotem.
 Contract RS4 (Type RS1 Broad Gauge) - 8 "T-M" pairs in 2008, to upgrade 4-car trains to 6-car trains in Red, Yellow and Blue Line.
 Contract RS6 (Type RS1 Broad Gauge) - 68 "T-M" pairs in 2011, to upgrade 4-car trains to 6-car trains in Red, Yellow and Blue Line.
 Contract RS9 (Type RS3 Standard Gauge) - 10×4+9×6=94 coaches and 34 "T-M" pairs, total 162 coaches in 2013, to upgrade 4-car trains to 6-car trains in Green and Violet Line.
 Contract RS10 (Type RS10 Standard Gauge) - 81×6=486 coaches in 2013, for Pink, Magenta and Gray Line. These trains are jointly developed by Hyundai Rotem and BEML (120 of these coaches were imported directly from South Korea and remaining 366 coaches were made in BEML's plant in India). Also, they are capable of Unmanned Train Operations.
 Contract RS13 (Type RS1 Broad Gauge) - 5×8=40 coaches and 28 "T-M" pairs, total 96 coaches (10DT+48M+38T) in 2015, to upgrade 6-car trains to 8-car trains in Red, Yellow and Blue Line.
 Contract RS15 (Type RS1 Broad Gauge) - 40 "T-M" pairs in 2019, to upgrade 6-car trains to 8-car trains in thirty-nine 6-car trains in Red Line and one 6-car trains in Blue Line (Yellow Line doesn't have RS1 trains since 2023).
Total: 1444 coaches (75×8 for RS1 Broad Gauge, 358 for RS3 Standard Gauge and 81×6 for RS10 Standard Gauge)

Mumbai Metro 

 63x6=378 coaches (red and yellow lines)
 21x6=126 coaches (red and yellow lines, additional order)
 12x6=72 coaches (red and yellow lines, additional order)

Total - 576 coaches

Namma Metro 

 50x3=150 coaches. (Phase 1) (In partnership with Hyundai Rotum)
 50x3=150 coaches (upgrading of previous 3 coach trains to 6 coach trains)
Total - 300 coaches

Jaipur Metro 

 10x4=40 coaches

Kolkata Metro 

 14x6=84 coaches (green line)
 3x6=18 coaches (green line, additional order)

Total - 102 coaches

Bombardier India (Acquired by Alstom) 
Bombardier (Now, Alstom ) built a £26m factory in Savli, Gujarat. Production at Savli began in June 2009. Bombardier was acquired by Alstom on 29 January 2021.

Delhi Metro 

 43x4=172 + 42x6=252 Total 424 coaches (Year- 2007, Type-  RS2 Broad Gauge)
 114 coaches(Year- 2010, Type-  RS2 Broad Gauge)
 76 coaches (Year- 2011, Type-  RS2 Broad Gauge) (To upgrade 4/6 car trains to 6/8 car trains)
 162 coaches (Year- 2015, Type-  RS2 Broad Gauge) (To upgrade 6 car trains to 8 car trains)
 40 coaches (Year- 2019, Type-  RS2 Broad Gauge) (To upgrade 6 car trains to 8 car trains)
Total - 816 coaches (BG)

Agra Metro 

 29x3=87 coaches

Kanpur Metro 

 38x3=114 coaches

Meerut Metro 

 10x3=30 coaches (These trains are the same as Delhi-Meerut RRTS corridor but of 3 coach configuration)

Alstom India 
In 2013, Alstom built a factory in Sri City, Andhra Pradesh. The 156-acre plant will be used to supply trains to cities in India and abroad. It also provides signalling & telecommunications systems.

Chennai Metro 

 42x4=168 coaches (Phase 1)
 10x4=40 coaches (Phase 1 extension)
 26x3=78 coaches (Phase 2 - line 4)
Total - 286 coaches

Kochi Metro 

 25x3=75 coaches

Lucknow Metro 

 20x4=80 coaches

Mumbai Metro 

 31x8=248 coaches (aqua line)

Delhi Metro 

 52x6=312 coaches (Year-2022, RS-17 type, to be used on pink, magenta and silver line)

Indore Metro 

 25x3=75 coaches (Phase 1)

Bhopal Metro 

 27x3=81 coaches (Phase 1)

Pune Metro 

 22x3=66 coaches (Line 3)

Hyundai Rotem

Delhi Metro 

 49x4=196 coaches (Year- 2007, Type-  RS3 Standard Gauge) (Since Hyundai Rotum does not have a factory in India, they used BEML's plant to complete the order on transfer of technology agreement)
 27x6=162 coaches (Year- 2013, Type-  RS3 Standard Gauge)(Since Hyundai Rotum does not have a factory in India, they used BEML's plant to complete the order on transfer of technology agreement)
 81x6=486 coaches (Year- 2013, Type-  RS10 Standard Gauge)(These trains are jointly developed by Hyundai Rotum and BEML. They are capable of Unmanned Train Operations. 120 of these 486 coaches were imported directly from South Korea and remaining 366 coaches were made in BEML's plant in India)
Total - 478 coaches (SG)

Ahmedabad Metro 

 32x3=96 coaches (Phase 1)

Namma Metro 

 50x3=150 coaches. (Phase 1) (In partnership with BEML)

Hyderabad Metro 

 57x3=171 coaches (Phase 1)(Since Hyundai Rotum does not have a factory in India, most trains were made in BEML's factory on transfer of technology agreement, some were imported directly from South Korea)

Integral Coach Factory (ICF) 
Integral Coach Factory s the largest rolling stock for Indian Railways..

Kolkata Metro 

 18x6=108 coaches (Medha series for blue line)
 8x6=48 coaches (for blue line)
 38x6=228 coaches (for purple line and orange line)
 12x6=72 coaches (for yellow line)

Total - 456 coaches

Titagarh Firema
Titagarh Firema is Titagarh-based Rolling stock manufacturing company. It is part of a Titagarh Group. They operate a factory in the Indian state of West Bengal

Namma Metro 

 36x6= 216 (34 out of these 36 trains will be made in India in partnership with CRRC(winner of the contract) via transfer of technology agreement. 2 will be directly imported from China)

Pune Metro 

 34x3= 102 coaches (phase 1)

Medha Servo Drives Pvt Ltd
In 2017, Medha Servo Drives planned to invest  8,000 million for metro rail coach factory in Telangana.

In February 2022 the factory was inaugurated and became the largest private rail coach factory in India.

 In 2021, it got a contract to supply 10 rakes for Mumbai Monorail worth 590 crore INR.

CRRC 
Namma Metro

 36x6=216 coaches (Phase 2) (2 trains will be directly imported from China and remaining 34 will e made by Titagarh Wagons under transfer of technology agreement)

Rapid Metro Gurgaon 

 12x3=36 coaches (Contract awarded to Siemens but subcontracted to CRRC )

Kolkata Metro 

 14x6=84 coaches (Dalian series for Orange line)

Mumbai Metro 

 16x4= 48 coaches (Blue line / line 1)

Nagpur Metro 

 23x3=69 coaches (phase 1)

Noida Metro 

 19x4= 76 coaches (Phase 1 aqua line)

Navi Mumbai Metro 

 8x3=24 coaches (Line 1)

Legislation 

The subject of Railways is in the Union List of the Seventh Schedule of the Constitution, giving Parliament the exclusive power to enact legislation concerning it. According to former Minister of Urban Development Kamal Nath, "Since the Metro rail is a central subject, it has been decided that all such projects in the country, whether within one municipal area or beyond, shall be taken up under the Central Metro Acts."

Construction of metros in India is governed by the centrally enacted The Metro Railways (Construction of Works) Act, 1978 which defines itself as an act to provide for the construction of works relating to metro railways in the metropolitan cities and for matters connected therewith. Operation and maintenance of metros are governed by The Delhi Metro Railway (Operation and Maintenance) Act, 2002. Both laws were amended in 2009 with the passing of The Metro Railways (Amendment) Act, 2009. The amendment expanded the coverage of both the acts to all metropolitan areas of India.

Initially, state governments attempted to implement metro rail projects through various Tramways Act. However, the Commissioner of Railways Safety (CRS), who operates under the Ministry of Civil Aviation, is tasked with providing safety certification for metro rail projects. The CRS refused safety certification unless the projects were implemented under a Metro Act enacted by the state government and published in The Gazette of India. Research Design and Standards Organization (RDSO), another railway entity, also refused certification to projects not implemented under the criteria. Subsequently, several state governments have enacted their own Metro Acts.

See also 

 Urban rail transit
 List of metro systems
 List of monorail systems
 List of tram and light rail transit systems
 List of suburban and commuter rail systems
 List of bus rapid transit systems in India
 Rail transport in India
 High-speed rail in India
 List of high-speed railway lines in India
 Dedicated freight corridors in India
 Aerial lift in India

Notes

References 

Transport in India
 
 
 
 
Tram transport in India